Quercus robur, the pedunculate oak, is a species of flowering plant in the beech and oak family, Fagaceae. It is a large tree, native to most of Europe and western Asia, and is widely cultivated in other temperate regions. It grows on circumneutral soils in the lowlands and is notable for its value to natural ecosystems, supporting a very wide diversity of herbivorous insects and other pests, predators and pathogens.

Description

Quercus robur is a deciduous tree up to 40 m tall, with a single stout trunk that can be as much as 11 m in girth (circumference at breast height) or even 14 m in pollarded specimens. Older trees tend to be pollarded, with boles (the main trunk) 2-3 m long. These live longer and become more stout than unpollarded trees. The crown is spreading and unevenly domed, and trees often have massive lower branches. The bark is greyish-brown and closely grooved, with vertical plates. There are often large burrs on the trunk, which typically produce many small shoots. Oaks do not produce suckers but do recover well from pruning or lightning damage. The twigs are hairless and the buds are rounded (ovoid), brownish and pointed.

The leaves are arranged alternately along the twigs and are broadly oblong or ovate, 10-12 cm long by 7-8 cm wide, with a short (typically 2-3 mm) petiole. They have a cordate (auricled) base and 3-6 rounded lobes, divided no further than half way to the midrib. The leaves are usually glabrous or have just a few simple hairs on the lower surface. They are dark green above, paler below, and are often covered in small disks of spangle gall by autumn.

Flowering takes place in spring (early May in England). It is wind-pollinated. The male flowers occur in narrow catkins some 2-4 cm long and arranged in small bunches; the female flowers are small, brown with dark red stigmas, about 2 mm in diameter and are found at the tips of new shoots on peduncles 2-5 cm long.

The fruits (acorns) are borne in clusters of 2-3 on a long peduncle (stalk) 4-8 cm long. Each acorn is 1.5-4 cm long, ovoid with a pointed tip, starting out whitish-green and becoming brown, then black. As with all oaks, the acorns are carried in a shallow cup which can be distinctive in identifying the species. It is an "alternate bearing" species, which means that big crops of acorns are produced every other year.

Taxonomy 
Quercus robur (from the Latin quercus, "oak" + robur "hardwood, oak wood,  oak") was named by Linnaeus in Species Plantarum (vol. 2, p.996) in 1753. It is the type species of the genus and classified in the white oak section (Quercus section Quercus).

It has numerous common names, including "common oak", "European oak" and "English oak". In French, it is called "chêne pédoncule."

The genome of Q. robur has been completely sequenced (GenOak project); a first version was published in 2016. It comprises 12 chromosome pairs (2n = 24), about  genes and 750 million bp.

There are many synonyms, and numerous varieties and subspecies have been named. The populations in Italy, southeast Europe, and Asia Minor and the Caucasus are sometimes treated as separate species, Q. brutia Tenore, Q. pedunculiflora K. Koch and Q. haas Kotschy respectively.

Quercus × rosacea Bechst. (Q. petraea x Q. robur) is the only naturally-occurring hybrid, but the following crosses with other white oak species have been produced in cultivation:
 Q. × bimundorum (Q. alba × Q. robur) (two worlds oak)
 Q. × macdanielli (Q. macrocarpa × Q. robur) (heritage oak)
 Q. × turneri Willd. (Q. ilex × Q. robur) (Turner's oak)
 Q. × warei (Q. robur fastigiata x Q. bicolor).

There are numerous cultivars available, among which the following are commonly grown:
 'Fastigiata', cypress oak, is a large imposing tree with a narrow columnar habit.
 'Concordia', golden oak, is a small, very slow-growing tree, eventually reaching , with bright golden-yellow leaves throughout spring and summer.  It was originally raised in Van Geert's nursery at Ghent in 1843.
 'Pendula', weeping oak, is a small to medium-sized tree with pendulous branches, reaching up to 15 m.
 'Purpurea' is another small form, growing to 10 m, with purple leaves.
 'Pectinata' (syn. 'Filicifolia'), cut-leaved oak, is a cultivar where the leaf is pinnately divided into fine, forward-pointing segments.

Identification
The species most likely to be confused with it is sessile oak, which shares much of its range. Quercus robur is distinguished from Q. petraea by its leaves having auricles at the base, the very short petiole, its clusters of acorns being borne on a long peduncle, and the lack of stellate hairs on the underside of the leaf. The two often hybridise in the wild, the hybrid being Quercus × rosacea.

Turkey oak is also sometimes confused with it, but that species has "whiskers" on the winter buds and deeper lobes on the leaves (often more than half way to the midrib). The acorn cups are also very different.

Habitat and ecology

Pedunculate oak is a long-lived tree of high-canopy woodland, coppice and wood-pasture, and it is commonly planted in hedges. When compared to sessile oak, it is more abundant in the lowlands of the south and east in Britain, and it occurs on more neutral (less acid) soils. It is rare on thin, well-drained calcareous (chalk and limestone) soil. Sometimes it is found on the margins of swamps, rivers and ponds, showing that it is fairly tolerant of intermittent flooding. Its Ellenberg values in Britain are L = 7, F = 5, R = 5, N = 4, and S = 0.

Within its native range, Q. robur is valued for its importance to insects and other wildlife, supporting the highest biodiversity of insect herbivores of any British plant (at least 400 species). The most well-known of these are the ones that form galls, which number about 35. In Britain, the knopper gall is very common, and Andricus grossulariae produces somewhat similar spiky galls on the acorn cups. Also common in Britain are two types of spherical galls on the twigs: the oak marble gall and the cola nut gall. The latter are smaller and rougher than the former. For people who find these galls, it can be interesting to know that a single, large exit hole indicates that the wasp inside has escaped, whereas a number of smaller holes shows that it was parasitised by another insect, and these emerged instead. The undersides of oak leaves are often covered in spangle galls, which persist after the leaves fall.

The quantity of caterpillar species on an oak tree increases with the age of the tree, with blue tits and great tits timing their egg hatching to the leaves opening. The most common caterpillar species include the winter moth, the green tortrix and the mottled umber, all of which can become extremely abundant on the first flush of leaves in May, but the oak trees do recover their foliage later in the year.

The acorns are typically produced in large quantities every other year (unlike Q. petraea, which produces large crops only every 4-10 years) and form a valuable food resource for several small mammals and some birds, notably Eurasian jays Garrulus glandarius. Jays were overwhelmingly the primary propagators of oaks before humans began planting them commercially (and still remain the principal propagators for wild oaks), because of their habit of taking acorns from the umbra of its parent tree and burying them undamaged elsewhere. Mammals, notably squirrels who tend to hoard acorns and other nuts, usually leave them too abused to grow in the action of moving or storing them.

Chemistry 
Grandinin/roburin E, castalagin/vescalagin, gallic acid, monogalloyl glucose (glucogallin) and valoneic acid dilactone, monogalloyl glucose, digalloyl glucose, trigalloyl glucose, rhamnose, quercitrin and ellagic acid are phenolic compounds found in Q. robur. The heartwood contains triterpene saponins.

Diseases
 Acute oak decline
 Powdery mildew caused by Erysiphe alphitoides
 Sudden oak death

Notable trees

The largest historical oak was known as the Imperial Oak from Bosnia and Herzegovina. This specimen was recorded at 17.5 m in circumference at breast height and estimated at over 150 m³ in total volume. It collapsed in 1998.

Two individuals of notable longevity are the Stelmužė Oak in Lithuania and the Granit Oak in Bulgaria, which are believed to be more than 1500 years old, possibly making them the oldest oaks in Europe; another specimen, called the 'Kongeegen' ('Kings Oak'), estimated to be about 1,200 years old, grows in Jaegerspris, Denmark. Yet another can be found in Kvilleken, Sweden, that is over 1000 years old and  around. Of maiden (not pollarded) specimens, one of the oldest is the great oak of Ivenack, Germany. Tree-ring research of this tree and other oaks nearby gives an estimated age of 700 to 800 years. Also the Bowthorpe Oak in Lincolnshire, England is estimated to be 1,000 years old, making it the oldest in the UK, although there is Knightwood Oak in the New Forest that is also said to be as old.

In the Basque Country (Spain and France), the 'tree of Gernika' is an ancient oak tree located in Gernika, under which the Lehendakari (Basque prime minister) swears his oath of office.

The largest example in Australia is in Donnybrook, Western Australia.

Commercial forestry 

Quercus robur is planted for forestry, and produces a long-lasting and durable heartwood, much in demand for interior and furniture work. The wood of Q. robur is identified by a close examination of a cross-section perpendicular to fibres. The wood is characterised by its distinct (often wide) dark and light brown growth rings. There are rays of thin (about ) yellow or light brown lines running across the growth rings.

In culture
In the Scandinavian countries, oaks were considered the "thunderstorm trees", representing Thor, the god of thunder. A Finnish myth is that the World tree, a great oak which grew to block the movement of the sky, sunlight and moonlight, had to be felled, releasing its magic, thus creating the Milky Way. The oak tree also had a symbolic value in France. Some oaks were considered sacred by the Gauls; druids would cut down the mistletoe growing on them. Even after Christianization, oak trees were considered to protect as lightning would strike them rather than on nearby inhabitation. Such struck trees would often be turned into places of worship, like the Chêne chapelle.

In 1746, all oak trees in Finland were legally classified as royal property, and oaks had enjoyed legal protection already from the 17th century. The oak is also the regional tree of the Southwest Finland region.

During the French Revolution, oaks were often planted as trees of freedom. One such tree, planted during the 1848 Revolution, survived the destruction of Oradour-sur-Glane by the Nazis. After the announcement of General Charles de Gaulle's death, caricaturist Jacques Faizant represented him as a fallen oak.

In Germany, the oak tree can be found in several paintings of Caspar David Friedrich and in "Of the life of a Good-For-Nothing" written by Joseph Freiherr von Eichendorff as a symbol of the state protecting every citizen.

In Serbia the oak is a national symbol, having been part of the historical coat of arms of the Socialist Republic of Serbia, the historical coat of arms and flags of the Principality of Serbia, as well as the current traditional coat of arms and flag of Vojvodina. 

In England, the oak has assumed the status of a national emblem. This has its origins in the oak tree at Boscobel House, where the future King Charles II hid from his Parliamentarian pursuers in 1650 during the English Civil War; the tree has since been known as the Royal Oak. This event was celebrated nationally on 29 May as Oak Apple Day, which is continued to this day in some communities. 'The Royal Oak' is the third most popular pub name in Britain (with 541 counted in 2007) and HMS Royal Oak has been the name of eight major Royal Navy warships. The naval associations are strengthened by the fact that oak was the main construction material for sailing warships. The Royal Navy was often described as "The Wooden Walls of Old England" (a paraphrase of the Delphic Oracle) and the Navy’s official quick march is "Heart of Oak". In folklore, the Major Oak is where Robin Hood is purportedly to have taken shelter.

Oak leaves (not necessarily of this species) have been depicted on the Croatian 5 lipa coin; on old German Deutsche Mark currency (1 through 10 Pfennigs; the 50 Pfennigs coin showed a woman planting an oak seedling), and now on German-issued euro currency coins (1 through 5 cents); and on British pound coins (1987 and 1992 issues).

References

 Flora Europaea: Quercus robur
 Bean, W. J. (1976). Trees and shrubs hardy in the British Isles 8th ed., revised. John Murray.
 Rushforth, K. (1999). Trees of Britain and Europe. HarperCollins .
  Chênes: Quercus robur

External links 

 Oaks from Bialowieza Forest in Poland (biggest oak cluster with the monumental sizes in Europe) {English}
 Monumental Trees, Photos and location details of large English oak trees
 Latvia - the land of oaks
 Den virtuella floran - Distribution
 Quercus robur - information, genetic conservation units and related resources. European Forest Genetic Resources Programme (EUFORGEN)

robur
Trees of Asia
Trees of Europe
Trees of humid continental climate
Trees of mild maritime climate
Least concern plants
Least concern biota of Europe
Plants described in 1753
Taxa named by Carl Linnaeus
Garden plants of Europe
Ornamental trees